Benjamin Jekhowsky (born 1881 in Saint-Petersburg (Russia), died in 1975, Encausse-les-Thermes (France)) was a Russian–French astronomer, born in Saint-Petersburg in a noble family of a Russian railroad official.

After attending Moscow University, he worked at the Paris Observatory beginning in 1912.  Later he worked at the Algiers Observatory (at the time, Algeria was a colony of France), where he became known as a specialist in celestial mechanics. After 1934, he appears to have begun signing scientific articles as Benjamin de Jekhowsky. The Minor Planet Center credits his discoveries under the name "B. Jekhovsky" (with a v). In modern English transliteration, his name would be written as Zhekhovskii or Zhekhovsky.

He discovered 12 numbered minor planets, made more than 190 scientific publications and the asteroid 1606 Jekhovsky is named after him.

References 
 

1881 births
1975 deaths
Discoverers of asteroids

20th-century French astronomers
Emigrants from the Russian Empire to France
Astronomers from the Russian Empire
Imperial Moscow University alumni